Jüri Kärner (15 April 1940 – 25 September 2010) was an Estonian biologist.

1988-1993 he was the rector of Tartu University.

Awards:
 1997: Order of the National Coat of Arms, III class.

References

1940 births
2010 deaths
Estonian biologists
University of Tartu alumni
Academic staff of the University of Tartu
Rectors of the University of Tartu
Recipients of the Order of the National Coat of Arms, 3rd Class
Scientists from Tallinn